Bacelarella is a genus of African jumping spiders that was first described by Lucien Berland & J. Millot in 1941. This genus was named in honour of the Portuguese arachnologist Amélia Bacelar.

Species
 it contains eight species, found only in Africa:
Bacelarella conjugans Szüts & Jocqué, 2001 – Ivory Coast
Bacelarella dracula Szüts & Jocqué, 2001 – Ivory Coast, Nigeria
Bacelarella fradei Berland & Millot, 1941 (type) – West Africa, Congo, Malawi
Bacelarella gibbosa Wesolowska & Edwards, 2012 – Nigeria
Bacelarella iactans Szüts & Jocqué, 2001 – Ivory Coast
Bacelarella pavida Szüts & Jocqué, 2001 – Ivory Coast
Bacelarella tanohi Szüts & Jocqué, 2001 – Ivory Coast
Bacelarella tentativa Szüts & Jocqué, 2001 – Ivory Coast

References

Further reading
 

Salticidae genera
Salticidae
Spiders of Africa
Taxa named by Lucien Berland